Rod Lawler (born 12 July 1971) is an English professional snooker player. He is noted for his slow playing style which gave rise to his nickname, "Rod the Plod".

After turning professional in 1990, Lawler has reached one ranking tournament final—the 1996 International Open—where he lost 3–9 to John Higgins, and has won one minor-ranking tournament – Event 3 of the 2012/2013 Players Tour Championship – where he defeated Marco Fu 4–2 in the final.

Lawler has compiled over 100 competitive century breaks during his long career. His highest is a 143, in qualifying for the 2003 World Championship.

Career

Early career

Lawler turned professional in 1990. His first season proved to be quite successful as he reached the last 32 in the Dubai Classic, losing out 2–5 to former World Billiards Champion Rex Williams. He then followed this up with a run to the Quarter Finals of the Classic, beating John Virgo 5–3 to qualify, as well as Joe Johnson 5–3 in the second round, before losing 2–5 to Mike Hallett. His best run in a ranking tournament was in 1996, when he reached the final of the International Open, beating World Champion Stephen Hendry 5–3 in the second round, but his run ended in the final where he lost 9–3 to John Higgins.

He also reached the final of the 1994 Benson and Hedges Championship, losing 5–9 to Mark Williams in the Final.

In 1995, Lawler reached the semi-final of the Malta Masters, beating future UK Champion Matthew Stevens in the Quarter Final, however he lost in the semi-final to the home favourite Tony Drago. He followed up this result by reaching the last 16 of the Grand Prix, beating the aforementioned Tony Drago in the last 32, before being whitewashed 5–0 by Stephen Hendry.

Lawler has qualified for the final stages of the World Championship on two occasions, the first being in 1995, where he beat a young Marcus Campbell in qualifying, before losing to Peter Ebdon in the last 32 at the Crucible. He qualified again in 1996, beating former World Champion Dennis Taylor in the final qualifying round. At the Crucible he then beat 1991 World Champion John Parrott 10–6, before losing in the last 16 to Dave Harold by 13 frames to 6. This was, to date, his best World Championship performance.

In 1997, Lawler reached the semi-final of the Benson and Hedges Championship, losing a final frame decider against Andy Hicks.

His best result in the UK Championship came in 1998, where he beat Jamie Burnett and John Read, before losing to Matthew Stevens in the last 16.

Lawler also reached the Quarter Finals of the 2003 Welsh Open, beating players such as Stephen Maguire, Jimmy White and Michael Holt before losing 2–5 to seven time World Champion Stephen Hendry

Recent years
Lawler narrowly missed out on a place in the last 32 in the 2009 China Open, winning three qualifying matches, the last of which was against Matthew Stevens, to reach the venue in Beijing, only to lose 3–5 to local wildcard Yu Delu.
In 2010 however, Lawler did reach the last 32 of the China Open, winning three qualifying matches against Matthew Selt, Dominic Dale, and Ricky Walden. Also defeating wildcard Supoj Saenla 5–3, before losing to then number 8 seed Mark Selby

The 2011–12 was a disastrous season for Lawler. He reached the third qualifying round in three ranking events. Apart from that he lost a lot of matches which then proved quite costly at the end of the season as he finished ranked 73, losing his place on the main tour. He then entered the Q School and reached the semi-finals of Event 3 by beating another former professional Joe Delaney to regain his tour place for the next two seasons.

Lawler had a great start to the 2012–13 season as he won all four matches to qualify for the Wuxi Classic. At the venue he defeated Li Hang and Stephen Maguire to reach the last 16 where he was narrowly beaten 4–5 by Graeme Dott. In September he won his first professional title at the UK PTC 3 event defeating Marco Fu 4–2 in the final in Gloucester, Beating the likes of Stuart Bingham, Stephen Lee and Dominic Dale en route to the final.

Following his Gloucester success, he continued to perform well, reaching the final qualifying round of both the UK Championship and Haikou World Open tournaments, with his results enough to move him back inside the top 64 provisionally.

His victory over Fu at the UK PTC along with a semi-final run in the European Tour 2012/2013 – Event 6 meant that he qualified for the PTC Finals ranked 7th on the Order of Merit. At the venue in Galway he beat Cao Yupeng by a 4–2 scoreline, only to lose to Kurt Maflin in the last 16 by 4 frames to 3, having led throughout the match.

At the 2013 World Championship, Lawler beat Scottish Amateur Fraser Patrick 10–5, he then resisted an admirable fightback to beat Anthony McGill 10–9, after being 7–2 and 8–3 up. However, in the final qualifying round, he lost 7–10 to World number 21 Martin Gould, despite being 5–2 up at one point in the match, however, the progression to the final qualifying round netted him £8,200.

Lawler earned £49,050 during the 2012–13 snooker season. He also made 15 century breaks, more than in any previous season.

2013/2014 season

At the Start of the 2013–14, Lawler was ranked 59th in the World rankings. In the qualifiers for the 2013 Wuxi Classic, Lawler lost his qualifying match 2–5 against Chinese youngster Lyu Haotian. In the qualifiers for the Australian Goldfields Open, Lawler lost his opening match in the last 96 to Scotsman Ross Muir 1–5. Lawler lost his opening game in the Shanghai Masters 1–5 to Mohamed Khairy. Lawler ended this run of bad results to beat Jak Jones 4–0 to qualify for the inaugural Indian Open. He defeated Indian wildcard Kamal Chalwa 4–1, before receiving a bye to the last 32, due to the withdrawal of Ali Carter, however, he was defeated 2–4 by Neil Robertson. He followed this up with a run to the last 16 of the third European Tour event, beating James Cahill, Liam Highfield and John Higgins before losing to Mark Allen 2–4. Lawler also qualified for the International Championship, beating Ian Burns 6–4 in qualifying, he then beat Aditya Mehta 6–4, before losing 4–6 to Fergal O'Brien in the last 32. Lawler lost in the last 64 of the UK Championship, having defeated Thanawat Thirapongpaiboon 6–3, before losing 1–6 to John Higgins, he also qualified for the German Masters, defeating Mitchell Travis 5–1 in qualifying. He also qualified for the World Open, this time defeating Elliot Slessor, also by a 5–1 scoreline.

2014/2015 season

Lawler qualified for the first ranking tournament of the season, the Wuxi Classic, beating Vinnie Calabrese 5–3. In the first round proper, he faced Shaun Murphy who won the match 5–1. Lawler failed to qualify for both the Shanghai Masters and the Australian Goldfields Open but then reached the semi-finals of the second Euro Tour (PTC) event, eventually losing 3–4 to Mark Allen in a deciding frame. A solid run of results followed, reaching a quarter-final in PTC4 where he eventually lost 3–4 to Robert Milkins, and also reaching the fourth round of the UK Championship where he pulled one back against Mark Allen by beating him 6–4 in the third round, eventually losing 3–6 to Judd Trump. Lawler failed to achieve another deep run in a tournament for the rest of the season, but was consistent in qualifying for the main stages of ranking tournaments, and therefore accumulated enough prize money to finish 39th on the rankings list at the end of the season.

2018/2019 season
In November 2018, after winning his first round match against Anthony Hamilton at the UK Championships, Lawler was criticised for his slow play by World Snooker Chairman Barry Hearn taking an average of 39.8s per shot. Despite this, he reached the quarter final of the Shootout, where players have a limited time (15 seconds for the first five minutes; ten seconds thereafter) to play each shot.

2022/2023 season 
Rod regained his Main Tour Card in May 2022 by Qualifying in the first of a possible three Q School Events at Sheffield. The final qualifying round saw him beat Brandon Sergeant 4-3 which now earns him a two year card.

Performance and rankings timeline

Career finals

Ranking finals: 1

Minor-ranking finals: 1 (1 title)

Non-ranking finals: 5 (3 titles)

Amateur finals: 2 (2 titles)

References

External links

Rod Lawler at worldsnooker.com

1971 births
Living people
Snooker players from Liverpool
English snooker players
20th-century English people
21st-century English people